Llandyssil is a village in Powys, Wales, about two miles from the town of Montgomery.

The village is part of the Llandyssil community. In 2001 there were 420 inhabitants in the parish, of whom 300 lived in the village itself.

Connection with Celtic saints

Llandyssil takes its name from St Tysul, a little known Welsh saint of the 7th century AD. Only two churches in Wales were dedicated to this saint, Llandyssil in Montgomeryshire and Llandysul in Ceredigion, and the feast day for this saint was celebrated on 31 January. The old church in the village (largely demolished in 1866) stood in the graveyard to the SE of the present village. This suggests that the present settlement dates back to the period around 700AD. There is also a connection with another early Welsh and Breton saint, St Padarn.  On the highland to the south in Cefn y Coed is the farm Cwm Badarn. The Llandyssil Brook rises in this Cwm or valley, and between Cwm Badarn Farm and the Pinion is a rock cut spring, that was possibly a Holy Well, dedicated to St Padarn.

History
In the Medieval period, Llandyssil was in the Cantref of Cedewain in the Kingdom of Powys. The parish was divided into four townships: Bolbro, Bronywood (or Bronycoed), Bryntalch and Rhandir. Rhandir, which contained the parish church, was the largest of these townships. It was probably an amalgamation of three other townships; Cefn-y-coed, Coedywig and Trefganol. In 1536, following the Act of Union, Llandyssil became part of the new county of Montgomeryshire. For ecclesiastical administration, the parish was in the Bishopric of St Asaph, the Archdeaconry of Montgomery and the Deanery of Cedewain. 
For Parliamentary representation, Llandyssil fell within the County of Montgomery until 1885, when, for electoral purposes, it was included within the Montgomery Boroughs. It was transferred back to the County in 1918, when only one MP represented Montgomeryshire.
With the establishment of the Montgomeryshire County Council in 1894, Llandyssil Parish Council was created, and it was included in Forden Rural District Council. In 1974, as a result of Local Government reform, Llandyssil Parish Council became a Community Council within the Montgomeryshire District Council. At this time, Llanmerewig was joined with Llandyssil to form the new Community Council, and in 1984 this was renamed Abermule with Llandyssil Community Council. At this time, the Community Council covered the old parishes of Llanmerewig and Llandyssil, together with Dolforwyn, which had been a township in Bettws Cedewain parish. In 1996,  with the abolition of the Montgomeryshire District Council, the Community Council became part of Powys County Council.

Population and language
The Census returns are as follows:

In 1880 a portion of the township of Bolbro was transferred from Llandyssil to Llanmerewig and the size of the parish was reduced from 4187 acres to 3800 acres. This may be reflected in the decrease in population between the 1881 and 1891 censuses.

During the later part of the 18th century, it appears that the Welsh language was supplanted by English for general usage in the village. There are some Welsh speakers in the village, but they have mainly come from elsewhere in Montgomeryshire.

Archaeological and historic monuments
Llandyssil is particularly rich in archaeological sites, especially of the Later Bronze Age and Iron Age. To the NE it is overshadowed by Ffridd Faldwyn, possibly the largest Hillfort in Wales, which is adjacent to Town Hill in Montgomery. Most of the sites have been discovered by aerial photography. The main sites are:

Prehistoric
The prehistoric sites include:
Brynderwen Enclosure. NGR: SO2064995184. Ditched enclosure close to the river Severn. Late Neolithic Peterborough ware pottery. Dated to c.3350-3000 BC.
Cefn Llan Hillfort in Cefnycoed. NGR: SO20579476. Scheduled ancient monument. Enclosure situated on low hill, comprising a sub-rectangular platform 60m by 40m (north-south) rising to c1.5m above the ditch. The original entrance is to the south. Site now overgrown and bank starting to erode.
Cefn Llan Enclosure (to N of Hillfort). Triple ditched enclosure c121m across, triple ditches only visible on the S side, the rest being single or double ditched. Linear earthworks to SW could be related.
 Cloddiau. Possible Late Bronze or Iron Age Cattle Krall or Banjo enclosure with triple banks and funnel entrance. Triple ditched sub-circular enclosure 92 x 78m enclosing an inner area of 2526m. Well-defined entrance to NE with flanking ditches. Excavations in 1993 showed the 4m wide inner ditch was just below the edge of the scarp, but no stratigraphy survived in either the rampart or the interior.
Coed y Wig hillfort. NGR: SO1957096216. Iron Age Hillfort revealed by aerial photography. Possible enclosure, treble ditched to SE but only single ditch visible to E. NE part not visible. Site is set on 2 E-W ridges with a broad natural gully between. The ditches seem to be cutting across from one ridge to another.
Cuckoo Hill Hillfort. NGR: SO1829794715. 3-ditched ovate enclosure 132.1 x 89.6m with no obvious entrance. Ditches to W show as cropmarks - those to E as parchmarks and slight earthworks. Defences spanning 31m. Located on low SW-NW ridge. Later house platforms cut into earthworks on SE side. Excavation 1993: triple ditched enclosure with earthworks surviving to c.0.2m high, the inner ditch was identified - width 3.7m. No stratigraphy was present. Single rim-sherd of probable Roman date from upper fill of ditch
Fron Fraith Wood Hillfort. NGR: SO1695893508. North-west part of two ditched enclosures, possibly circular with diameter c90m. The ditches are c5m across and there is a possible entrance gap on east. The enclosure is 110m NE/SW by 65m across. Excavated in 1994.
Goron Ddu Hillfort. NGR: SO1860096570. East of Upper Bryntalch farm, on the crest of a short ridge, aligned north-east/south-west, overlooking the river Severn at an altitude of 200m OD, to the N of the village. The site consists of a double banked enclosure with widely spaced ditches. The inner ditch defines an approximately ovate enclosure measuring about 67m north-east/south-west and reducing in width from 62m at the south-west end to 40m at the north-east end. The outer ditch defines a sub-rectangular enclosure with rounded corners, measuring 131m north-east/south-west by about 95m overall. Geophysical survey has shown a concentration of features in the centre of the enclosure, but with insufficient clarity to distinguish round houses.
Mount Pleasant Defended Enclosure. NGR: SO1898893669. Scheduled ancient monument 1996. Double-ditched enclosure, 94.4m by 110m, with surviving earthworks, partly encapsulated in field boundaries. Excavation in 1994 identified the inner edge of the ditch, inside which were the remains of a clay dump rampart. Inside the rampart were remains of a hearth and grains of spelt wheat, and two post-holes which may have formed part of a four-post structure. Radiocarbon dates from the postholes of 2270-2330BP (Before Present) suggest that the site was occupied in the earlier Iron Age.

Roman
The Roman Road from Forden Gaer/Lavrobrinta to Caersws runs through the parish along the river, probably largely on the alignment of the B3484 from Caerhowel railway bridge to the Abermule railway bridge. During the construction in 2006 of the “Felin Hafren” housing estate in Abermule, a length of the Roman road was uncovered.

Early Medieval and Norman
Brynderwen Motte and Bailey Castle guarding the river Severn crossing. An early castle on the Severn. The motte has gone and the bailey area is occupied by a farm.
Cefn Bryntalch Motte and Bailey Castle. To the SW of Cefn Bryntalch house. Earthen motte or ringwork at the NE end of a scarped natural ridge, with a cross-ditch dividing it from the bailey.
Mound by Llandyssil Bridge. Suggested barrow, but with flat top and more likely to be a medieval mill mound. Place names in vicinity, such as Cae Melyn and Ty Melyn (originally Cae Melin and Ty Melin - Welsh for Mill Field and Mill House), may support its identification as a windmill mound for a Post mill.

Church and chapel buildings

Old Church and Graveyard. The former church of St Tysul stood on the hillside overlooking the village. Now only a stone porch with an 18th-century doorway remains, standing in the churchyard. The single-chambered medieval parish church is shown in a woodcut illustration to have been extensively rebuilt in the 18th century with round arched windows and roof dormers. It had also the most elaborate of the Montgomeryshire timber west bell-towers — a tower which was enclosed by an open gallery, corbelled out from the supporting framework, built inside the nave. Lych Gate to the graveyard by the architect Harold Hughes, of Bangor 1907.
St Tysul. By the architect Thomas Henry Wyatt, 1863–6. Nave with west aisle, chancel, SE tower and spire. The church is orientated nearly north–south rather than the usual east–west. The four-bay arcade to the nave with polished red granite columns, with red sandstone and white limestone blocks used to decorate the stone arches. Chancel arch in Early English style. Caen stone and alabaster reredos. Monument to John Pugh (1784). Bells by Mears and Stainbank of Whitechapel, and recent clock by Joyce of Whitchurch.
Wesleyan Chapel, with Gothic windows, now converted into a house called “The Arches”.
Bethesda Presbyterian Chapel, Cefn y Coed. Low building with three bays of cambered sash windows and porch. Founded 1840, but possibly the building is later. A good example of a simple rural chapel. Closed in 2008 and currently unused.

Notable buildings and bridges 

Cefn Bryntalch. The house of 1867–69 by G F Bodley is an important early example of the Queen Anne revival. The house was completed by Philip Webb. The client was Richard Jones, who had made a fortune in the flannel trade. The exterior is cleanly detailed and well-executed in red brick, with prominent string-courses. The south front with three big gables and a balance of irregular chimneys and near-regular windows, and many C18 features – a hipped roof, two bays, sash-windows, and the central Venetian window. The symmetrical entrance front is rather a C17 vernacular – the west front is picturesque and irregular in contrast, an asymmetrical gable anchored by a shafted chimney; lower tile-hung wing. The interior is neo-Georgian, though the plan is arranged with the main sides at right-angles. The rear Courtyard has one side – a low service range extends from the house, with a stringcourse, and pediment over the doorway. At the North end, a large barn with timber-framing picturesquely closes the vista. The house is a Grade II* listed building and its Victorian garden is listed, also at Grade II*, on the Cadw/ICOMOS Register of Parks and Gardens of Special Historic Interest in Wales. The hall was home to the composer Peter Warlock in the early 20th century.
Rectory. 1812–14 by the Shrewsbury architect Joseph Bromfield. An attractive and well-preserved Regency design. Stuccoed, with hipped roofs and hoodmoulded windows. The original front was of three bays. The low hip-roofed tower to the rear gives the air of a picturesque Tuscan villa. The interior of the house was modified, bay windows and a new brick wing were added by Thomas Penson in 1858 for the Rev Henry Foulkes.  In 1865, the east range was added to match by Thomas Garland, clerk of works to Thomas Henry Wyatt. He also renewed the veranda, keeping the original iron stanchions, but adding wooden circles in the spandrels of the arcade. Grade II listed.
Former School, opposite the church and built at the same time. By the architect Thomas Henry Wyatt. Now Village Hall Two-bay school with truncated chimney; gabled master's house. The interior contains some woodwork from the old church's box pews. The building has recently been restored and a weatherboarded extension added to the south.
Phipp's Tenement. Three-bay farmhouse built of substantial square-timber framing. The dormer gable is dated 1630. At right angles to the main building a timber framed barn.
Plas Robin. An old stone house which stood on the opposite side of the road to Phipp's Tenement. Demolished before 1960.
Oak House and Smithy (Inn and later village shop),  built mainly of local Llandyssil siltstone and dating c1700, with surviving “Montgomeryshire” iron-framed windows. Possibly an Inn when the Old Coach road came through the village. Became the village shop when the Upper House was built. Shop owned by the Varley family and closed in 1959–60.

The Upper House. Built as a Public House pre 1849. The village Quoits Court was behind the Pub until 2003. 

Brynderwen Bridge - in the old Llandyssil parish, close to Abermule. A single 109-ft span across the Severn (and a smaller span across the canal) on five iron girders. Designed by Thomas Penson. The openwork lettering on the outer ones reads 'This second iron bridge constructed in the county of Montgomery was erected in the year 1852'; 'Thomas Penson, County Surveyor'; 'Brymbo Company, Ironfounders'. The bridge came from Brymbo Ironworks, later steelworks,  near Wrexham, and would have been transported to the site by the Montgomeryshire Canal. Grade II* listed.
Fron Footbridge. An elegant iron suspension footbridge over the river Severn, taking a footpath from Severn Villa to Lower Llegodig Farm. Built in 1926 by David Rowell & Co, London (Westminster) bridge builders in 1926.
Middle Llegodig. Timber-framed lobby-entry house of c. 1700, a late example of its type. In the later C18, the eaves were raised and a matching bay added to the right.
Fronfraith Hall, designed by James Pickard of Shrewsbury, c1860 for ?Morris Jones. West wing burnt down in 1966.

Clergy

Sinecure Rectors

1537  John Vaughan
1556  Morgan Griffith
1575  Griffith Lewis D.D.
1607  Godfrey Goodman MA
1616  Thomas Kyffin  
1622  John Berkeley D.D.
1625  Robert Lloyd
1660  Michael Hughes

Quoiting
Playing quoits was a widespread pastime in many rural areas. It had largely died in much of England by the 2nd World War, but after the War enjoyed a revival in Mid-Wales, when the quoits were made by a light engineering company in Newtown. In Llandyssil the “Old” or Long quoits rules were followed. The quoits court was moved to behind the Upper House Public House by 1983, when an international game was played between Wales and Scotland. The Welsh team was captained by Glyn Owen of Llandyssil, and other village players were Les Owen and George Mills. The Welsh team lost to Scotland. In the 1991 International match at Llandyssil, when Les Owen was in the team, Wales convincingly beat Scotland 252 to 83. The last championship match was held at Llandyssil in 2003, after which the court was closed. It is to be hoped that the sport might be revived in Llandyssil in the future.

Sheep Dog Trials
The 2012 Welsh National Sheep Dog Trials were held on the field by Llandyssil bridge at Henfron, Llandyssil, between 19 and 21 July 2012.

Notable people
Rear Admiral Sir Charles Thomas Jones (1778–1853), Royal Navy officer, knighted in 1809. High Sheriff of Montgomeryshire 1832.

George Thomas (1786–1859), writer and poet, the first postmaster of Llandyssil. In 1817 he wrote a poem about Otter Hunting, commemorated by a painting in the National Museum of Wales.
Henry Powell Ffoulkes (1815–1886), Rector of Llandyssil 1857–1879, he demolished and re-placed the old Church in Llandyssil in 1863. 
 Brigadier General Lumley O W Jones (1876–1918), Brigadier General, Chevalier of the Legion of Honour; last of 12 British General Officers to die on the Somme.
Senator Rupert Davies (1879-1967), Canadian politician and newspaper editor, purchased Fronfraith Hall in 1932 and used until sold in 1948.
Peter Warlock (1894–1930), composer, lived at Cefn Bryntalch. Composed many of his more important works there and played the organ in Llandyssil Church.
Nigel Heseltine (1916–1995), writer and colonial administrator brought up at Cefn Bryntalch.
Brian Sewell (1931-2015), art historian and media personality brought up at Cefn Bryntalch
Diz Disley  (1931–2010), jazz guitarist, lived in Oak Cottages in the 1930s.
John Billington (born 1936), junior high jump Champion; AAA championships in 1954.
Julie Christie (born 1940), film actress, lived at Whitehall Farm, Cefn y Coed, 1981–2010.
Iolo Williams (born 1962), naturalist and TV presenter, lives in Llandyssil.

Gallery

Notes

References

External links

Llandyssil Community Trust, Village Hall and Dragonfest
Local history resources for Llandyssil
Homepage for Abermule with Llandyssil Community Council
Details of the recently demolished brick arch in the garden at Brooklyn, opposite the Church
Listed buildings in Abermule with Llandyssil Community Council
Records held by Powys County Archives
Victorian Powys- useful information for Llandyssil given in the Montgomery Town section
Indexed database for archaeological finds in under Llandyssil Community entry.
Photos of Llandyssil and surrounding area on geograph

Villages in Powys
Prehistoric Wales
History of Powys
History of Montgomeryshire
Historic Montgomeryshire Parishes
Registered historic parks and gardens in Powys